In statistics, the mean integrated squared error (MISE) is used in density estimation.  The MISE of an estimate of an unknown probability density is given by

where ƒ is the unknown density, ƒn is its estimate based on a sample of n independent and identically distributed random variables. 
Here, E denotes the expected value with respect to that sample.

The MISE is also known as L2 risk function.

See also
 Minimum distance estimation
 Mean squared error

References

Estimation of densities
Nonparametric statistics
Point estimation performance